Hermann Fritz Gustav Goos (11 January 1883 – 18 May 1968) was a German physicist and astronomer.

Life and work 

Goos attended the Johanneum Gymnasium in Hamburg, from where he graduated with a high school diploma in March 1902. Until April 1903 he then worked in the machine factory Wimmel & Landgraf in  Hamburg. In October 1903 he began to study mathematics and science at the Königlichen Technischen Hochschule (Royal Institute of Technology, now Technical University of Berlin) in Berlin. In March 1905 he joined the University of Bonn in the summer semester to study astronomy and mathematics. In the following winter semester, he continued his studies in Berlin, but in April 1906 went back to Bonn, where he earned a doctorate degree in astronomy in 1908.

After graduating, he became an assistant at Bonn Observatory, and in 1909 he became an assistant at the Hamburg Observatory. From 1911 he worked at the Physical State Institute (founded in 1885 as the Physical State Laboratory) in Hamburg, where he worked as an assistant professor (Wissenschaftlicher Rat) until 1948.

As an adjunct professor at the University of Hamburg, Goos worked in the area of optical spectroscopy. He investigated the emission and absorption properties  of various objects such as the electric arc or thin metal layers (of metals such as silver and gold) in the optical, infrared and ultraviolet spectral ranges. At the end of 1912, he discovered a systematic dependence of the wavelengths in the spectrum of an arc on its length and its electrical parameters such as the current used. In the spring of 1913, he was able to confirm these observations in the better-equipped laboratory of Heinrich Kayser in Bonn. Goos also investigated the effect of light on phosphors and worked on the detection of light by a microphotometer.

One of Goos' best known works is the experimental evidence of displacement of a totally reflected light beam, work he did together with his doctoral student Hilda Hänchen (later Hilda Lindberg-Hänchen). This phenomenon is called the Goos-Hänchen effect.

In 1933 Goos signed the Vow of allegiance of the Professors of the German Universities and High-Schools to Adolf Hitler and the National Socialistic State.

Selected publications

References

External links 
 Publications of Fritz Goos in the Astrophysics Data System

20th-century German astronomers
20th-century German physicists
1883 births
1968 deaths
Scientists from Hamburg
Academic staff of the University of Hamburg
University of Bonn alumni
Technical University of Berlin alumni